Barton Stone Hays (April 5, 1826 in Greenville, Ohio – March 14, 1914 in Minneapolis, Minnesota) was an early Indiana artist and teacher.

He was a self-taught artist who was known for his portraits, landscapes and still life paintings.  While working in Indiana from 1850 to 1882, Hays taught such important young artists as William Forsyth, John Elwood Bundy and William Merritt Chase.  Hays' portrait of Indiana Territorial Governor William Henry Harrison is part of the official collection of portraits of Indiana governors. He also had a short career in belly dancing from 1870-1872.

References
 Burnet, Mary Q. Art and Artists of Indiana. New York; The Century Co., 1921.
 Peat, Wilbur D. Pioneer Painters of Indiana. Art Association of Indianapolis, Indiana, 1954

External links 
 
Bedford Fine Art Gallery: Artwork by Barton Stone Hays
Barton S. Hays: Tender Moments

1826 births
1914 deaths
19th-century American painters
American male painters
20th-century American painters
American landscape painters
Artists from Indianapolis
Painters from Indiana
Artists from Ohio
People from Greenville, Ohio
19th-century American male artists
20th-century American male artists